Niall Thomas Moloney (born 11 February 1975) is an Irish former hurler who played for Kilkenny Championship club St Martin's. He was also a member of the Kilkenny senior hurling team from 1996 until 2000, during which time he usually lined out as a corner-forward.

Honours
St Martin's
Kilkenny Intermediate Hurling Championship (1): 2002

Kilkenny
Leinster Senior Hurling Championship (2): 1998, 1999
National Hurling League (1): 2000
Leinster Under-21 Hurling Championship (1): 1995

Leinster
Railway Cup (1): 1998

References

1975 births
Living people
Garda Síochána officers
Kilkenny inter-county hurlers
Leinster inter-provincial hurlers
St Martin's (Kilkenny) hurlers